"God Gave Me You" is a song recorded by American country music artist Bryan White, and written by Andy Goldmark, Jamie Houston and James Dean Hicks. It was released in October 1999 as the second single from the album How Lucky I Am. The song reached No. 40 on the Billboard Hot Country Singles & Tracks chart.

Chart performance

In popular culture
In 2015, "God Gave Me You" experienced a major surge in popularity in the Philippines after it became associated with AlDub—a popular on-air couple seen on the Kalyeserye segment of the local variety show Eat Bulaga!. White learned of the phenomenon in September 2015 after noting the significant amount of discussion related to AlDub and the song on Twitter. He explained that "the one thing that was reinforced for me is to never underestimate the impact of music and what it can do. Many years ago I worked hard in making that the best it can be, and it just goes to show that it's in God's timing. It was a hit in the United States but nothing compared to here now."

References

1999 singles
1999 songs
Bryan White songs
Songs written by James Dean Hicks
Song recordings produced by Dann Huff
Country ballads
Asylum Records singles
Songs written by Andy Goldmark
Songs written by Jamie Houston (songwriter)